Alysson is a masculine or feminine given name, a variant form of Alison. Notable people with the name include:

Men:
Alysson Marendaz Marins (born 1976), Brazilian football player
Alysson Paolinelli, Brazilian agronomic engineer and public official
Alysson Ramos da Silva (born 1978), Brazilian left back
Woman:
Alysson Paradis (born 1982), French actress

See also
 Alyson, given name
 Allyson, given name
 Alisson (disambiguation)